Aedes capensis is a species of mosquito primarily found in forests in sub-Saharan Africa.

Classification
Aedes capensis is one of 9 species in the subgenus Albuginosus, which is only present in Africa.

Distribution
Aedes capensis has been recorded from South Africa, Cameroon, Central African Republic, Ivory Coast, Kenya, Malawi, and Uganda.

Biology

The larvae of Ae. capensis are primarily found in tree-holes.  They have also been collected from banana axils  and rock holes.  The eggs have been collected in bamboo pots (ovitraps).

Adults are rarely collected in human landing catches.  In human landing catches in Kenya, Ae. capensis were only collected in forest habitats, not in peridomestic or domestic settings.

Medical importance
As it seems Al. capensis do not commonly bite humans, it is unlikely that they are important in transmitting diseases to humans.  However, the bloodfeeding habits of this species should be investigated further to see if it plays a role in the maintenance of zoonosis.

References

Culicinae
Insects described in 1924